Adventures of an Army Nurse in Two Wars is a book edited by James Phinney Munroe and published in 1904 by Little, Brown and Company. It is in part an epistolary book in which the narrative is based on the letters and diary entries of Mary Phinney von Olnhausen, who is the protagonist of the book.

It covers the two wars in which Mary Phinney von Olnhausen worked as an army nurse, the American Civil War from 1861 to 1865 and the Franco-Prussian War in 1870.

Critical reception
In a review of the book for the American Journal of Nursing, M. E. Cameron wished Munroe had included more dates but was ultimately "deeply grateful for what he has given, and most particularly for allowing the letters and diary to convey their own impression and retain the individuality of the writer." A review in The Washington Star similarly noted that Munroe tries his best to maintain Phinney's viewpoint, concluding that the book "reflects vividly the scenes and incidents of two great wars as seen by the army nurse." A review for the Brooklyn Eagle felt that the significance of the book lies in the fact that it offers a woman's perspective of the wars, compared to the numerous books about the subject written by men. A review in the Detroit Free Press found the book to be a compelling account that provides a "graphic and deeply interesting" peek into the lives of army nurses.

In popular culture

Mercy Street, a PBS fictional TV series relates the life the Mansion House Hospital where Phinney was stationed. It relays Phinney diaries. A character based on Phinney, and named after Phinney, is played by Mary Elizabeth Winstead and is the series' lead character. The series was cancelled after two seasons.

References

External links
 Digital copy of the book

1904 books
20th-century books
Non-fiction books about war
Little, Brown and Company books